Morristown is a city in and the county seat of Hamblen County, Tennessee, United States. Morristown also extends into Jefferson County on the western and southern ends.  The city's population was recorded to be 30,431 at the 2020 United States census.  It is the principal city of the Morristown Metropolitan Statistical Area, which encompasses all of Grainger, Hamblen, and Jefferson counties. The Morristown metropolitan area is also part of the Knoxville-Morristown-Sevierville Combined Statistical Area.

Established in 1855, Morristown developed into a thriving community due to its strategic location at the intersection of two major stagecoach routes. It would experience turmoil from battles in its immediate area and its change of control under Union and Confederate forces during the Civil War. Following the war, Morristown furthered its industrial growth with companies expanding rail access, making it a prominent logistics hub into the 20th century. Since the mid-20th century, the city has established itself as the regional economic hub and metropolis of the Lakeway Area region following efforts to expand the industrial sector of the city's economy into a market with over 100 companies, providing a workforce of an estimated 30,000 people. In 2019, the city was reported to have a daytime population of 118,600, including those commuting to the city from surrounding counties and communities.

History

Early years and establishment
The first European settler was Gideon Morris, a farmer who arrived from the Watauga Settlement, a settlement that was leased to settlers from the inhabiting Cherokee tribes. Morris, along with his siblings, petitioned to have the Watauga Settlement annexed in the State of North Carolina. After the success of the petition, the settlement was named Morristown, and land grants containing Hamblen and Jefferson counties were assigned to Morris and his brothers Daniel and Absalom in 1787 by North Carolina officials.

Pioneer and folk-hero David Crockett lived in present-day Morristown with his father, John Crockett, and established a tavern in 1794. The current-day Crockett Tavern Museum sits at the approximate location of the former tavern and is listed on the National Register of Historic Places.

In 1855, Morristown was incorporated into a city. During the period between 1855 and 1870, Morristown's limits were divided along Main Street into Grainger and Jefferson counties. Many residents brought concerns regarding transportation and communication access in Morristown and neighboring communities such as Russellville and Panther Springs. After working with officials from the neighboring counties and the state government, Hamblen County was formed from portions of Grainger, Jefferson, Hawkins, and Greene counties.

Morristown was chosen as the county seat of Hamblen County shortly after its formation in 1870.

Civil War

As the Civil War approached, the town's sympathies were divided between the Union and secessionist sides. In December 1863, some 25,000 Confederate Army soldiers under the command of General James Longstreet arrived at Bethesda Presbyterian Church, northeast of the town, to spend the winter, after the Battle of Bean's Station. They remained there until February 1864 and used the Bethesda Church building as a hospital. Military engagements occurred near the church in both October and November 1864. On October 28, 1864, Union General Alvan C. Gillem attacked Confederate forces under General John C. Vaughn in the Battle of Morristown. They fought in and around the town with Gillem routing Vaughn's Confederates in what became known as "Vaughn's Stampede." Vaughn was forced to retreat to Carter's Station on the Watauga River in northeastern Tennessee. The battle resulted in about 335 total casualties. In the Battle of Bull's Gap ("Gillem's Stampede") in November, Confederate forces under General John C. Breckinridge prevailed over Gillem's troops, chasing the Union forces westward to a defensive position at Strawberry Plains near Knoxville. During one of these skirmishes, a cannonball penetrated one of the church walls, causing structural damage that was repaired by reinforcing the walls with large iron rods. The Union Army used the church as a hospital for soldiers wounded in these operations. Many soldiers from both sides are interred in the Bethesda Church cemetery. Eighty of the wartime burials are unidentified.

Later 18th century developments
Morristown saw a steady shift into an industrially-based economy in the early beginnings of the Industrial Revolution, around the early to late 19th century. The first industry in the area was the Shields Paper Mill, located on the Holston River, operating from 1825 to 1861. Other prominent early businesses included the Morristown Manufacturing Company and the later Knoxville-based J. F. Goodson Coffee Company in 1882.

From 1891 to 1928, Morristown was a terminal on the Knoxville and Bristol Railroad, commonly known by locals as the "Peavine Railroad." The railroad was a branch line of the Southern Railway that ran from downtown Morristown on Main Street to Corryton, a bedroom community outside of Knoxville. The Peavine Railroad had first operated between Morristown and Bean Station, with plans to connect north to the Cumberland Gap, but instead extended west through Grainger County towards Knoxville.

Mid 20th century to present day

American Enka and the labor movement 

	
In 1944, the American Enka Company, a rayon fiber producer based out of Asheville, North Carolina, began construction on a 230-acre plant in the Lowland region of Morristown, beginning operations in 1947.
 
In March 1950, workers at the facility walked out on strike. Officials from American Enka Company then advertised for replacements of the striking workers. Tensions soon built when residents of Morristown and Lowland appeared at the gates of the Enka plant to apply for the listed jobs. Violence then followed, with shots fired, cars damaged, and one adjacent house destroyed by dynamite. The then-governor of Tennessee, Gordon Browning, dispatched National Guard troops to restore order at the Enka factory. By the end of the strike, and following acts of violence and vandalism, its story had become national front-page news, and on-site congressional hearings regarding labor relations and the labor movement were held in Morristown, led by Democratic Senator Hubert Humphrey.

In 1985, the American Enka facility was acquired by BASF and continued under their operations until 1992, when it was sold to Lenzing AG. The plant closed in 2005, after the company that operated the plant, Liberty Fibers, filed for bankruptcy. The plant site and its adjacent wastewater treatment plant have since been annexed into the Morristown city limits.

Industrial development
Beginning in 1959, following then presidential candidate John F. Kennedy's exposure to poverty in Appalachia, Morristown officials began a joint effort with Tennessee economic development representatives to establish the city as a major industrial hub, and the program began with the construction and completion of the East Tennessee Valley Industrial District (ETVID) industrial park in eastern Morristown near Russellville.

By 1978, the  ETVID industrial park had reached its estimated capacity, prompting city officials to develop a second industrial park. After acquiring a  site in western Morristown near Morristown Regional Airport in the same year, city officials developed the site into the Morristown Airport Industrial District (MAID) industrial park in 1981. Five months after the park's completion, two companies opened facilities at the MAID. As overall economic prosperity continued to make gains in Morristown, city officials and development representatives have cited Morristown's industrial development initiative as an example of economic growth:

In the 1990s, the City of Morristown acquired over  near Interstate 81 exit 8 for its third industrial park, the East Tennessee Progress Center (ETPC). Initial site development such as roadway and utility upgrades were completed in 2001. Several large manufacturers opened facilities at the site, but further infrastructure upgrades, grading work, and property acquisition was done on the site throughout the 2000s and 2010s.

Following the 2007-2012 global economic crisis, Morristown saw the loss of one of its largest employers, Berkline, which closed after filing for Chapter 11 bankruptcy in 2011. The furniture manufacturer, which relocated to the city in 1937, eliminated 602 jobs and ended an era of Morristown being known as a predominately furniture manufacturing hub:

In 2018, Belgian bus manufacturer Van Hool announced the construction of a  facility at the ETPC, one of the largest industrial development projects in the history of Morristown. The project expects to create an estimated 650 jobs, over $47 million in private investment and an influx of interest of further industrial development in the Morristown area.

Downtown emergence and the "Skymart" project

The road now known as Main Street was first reported to have been built in 1792–1793 in an area between Grainger and Jefferson counties.

By 1833, Morristown had its first post office and store located along Main Street. Fourteen years later, railroad lines were built, stimulating further commercial growth until the beginning of the American Civil War.

By the dawn of the 20th century, Morristown saw another era of growth. Several new buildings emerged in the downtown area, including the Henry Street Post Office, the First National Bank Building, currently the second tallest building in downtown Morristown, and the Princess Theater. The Princess Theater would be the first theater in Morristown and showcased touring musical acts, ministerial shows, pageants, films, and special Grand Ole Opry performances. Following the opening of theaters in neighboring shopping complexes, the Princess Theater would close in 1982. It was demolished in 1995.

Following the 1950s, the downtown district saw losses in revenue, as a suburban shopping mall on the city's west side jeopardized businesses downtown. The city developed a plan to modernize Main Street by creating an "overhead sidewalk" as part of the nationwide push for urban renewal projects, enabling businesses to form on the second floor of existing buildings while serving as a canopy for passage below. Building owners spent nearly $2 million ($16 million today) upgrading their properties and linking them to ramps, while the government contributed over $5 million to build the elevated walkways. The underground channel for Turkey Creek was also enlarged and rerouted. In 1962, Turkey Creek, which bisects the street, flooded and damaged the downtown commercial district. The project was completed in 1967, becoming the first second-story sidewalk system in an American city. Over time, the Skymart has served as little more than a remnant of the idealism of 1960s urban renewal projects. Despite the aftermath of the project, the overhead sidewalks still stand in the downtown area.

Morristown is embarking on a resurrection of the Skymart, eyeing the structure as a key redevelopment tool of turning downtown into a social and commercial hub. It has been made a key element in a greenway master plan along Turkey Creek, with plans to connect downtown Morristown to Cherokee Park and Cherokee Lake. In an effort to renew public interest, city officials, the Crossroads Downtown Partnership, and the Morristown Area Chamber of Commerce hold events in the city's downtown or the "Skymart District" throughout the year, mainly during the warmer months of May to September.

On March 22, 2016, Main Street along with the rest Morristown's downtown district was officially listed on the National Register of Historic Places.

Geography
Morristown is situated in the upper region of East Tennessee in the Tennessee Valley between the Great Smoky Mountains to the south and Clinch Mountain to the north. It is considered part of a region known as the "Lakeway Area", consisting of an land area surrounding Cherokee and Douglas lakes. It is positioned nearly at the midpoint between Knoxville and the Tri-Cities region.

Cherokee Lake, an artificial reservoir built by the Tennessee Valley Authority in the 1940s, is north of the city.

Neighborhoods

 Alpha
 Barton Springs
 Brockland Acres
 Corbin Estates
 Dogwood Hills
 Drinnon Heights
 East Ridge
 Edgewood
 Fairview-Marguerite
 Hidden Acres
 Hillcrest
 Liberty Heights
 Lowland (partial)
 Lyn-Mar Estates
 Lyn-Ross Manor
 Old Towne
 Ridgeview
 Talbott (partial)
 West Hills
 Wildwood
 Wilderness Shores
 Witt

Important suburbs

 Baneberry
 Bean Station
 Jefferson City
 Mooresburg
 Russellville
 White Pine
 Whitesburg

Climate 
Morristown falls in the humid subtropical climate zone (Köppen climate classification Cfa), although it is not quite as hot as areas to the south and west of Tennessee due to the higher elevations. Summers are hot and humid, with July highs averaging , lows averaging , and an average of eight days per year with temperatures above . Winters are generally cool, with occasional small amounts of snow. The average monthly relative humidity is around 70 percent.

Demographics

2020 census

As of the 2020 United States census, there were 30,431 people, 11,639 households, and 6,985 families residing in the city.

2010 census
As of the census of 2010, there were 29,137 people, 11,412 households, and 7,278 families residing in the city. The population density was 1,194.7 people per square mile (461.2/km2). There were 12,705 housing units at an average density of 528.1 per square mile (203.9/km2). The racial makeup of the city was 86.52% White, 6.63% African American, 0.87% Asian, 0.20% Pacific Islander, and 2.15% from two or more races. Those of Hispanic or Latino origins were 19.37% of the population.

There were 11,412 households, out of which 22.5% had children under 17 years of age living with them, 45.2% were married couples living together, 11.4% had a female householder with no husband present, and 36.2% were non-families. 31% of all households were made up of individuals, and 11.0% had someone living alone who was 65 years of age or older. The average household size was 2.47 and the average family size was 3.07.

In the city, the population was spread out, with 24.85% under 17 years of age, 9.45% from 18 to 24, 26.5% from 25 to 44, 23.2% from 45 to 64, and 16% who were 65 years of age or older. The median age was 36 years. For every 100 females, there were 91.2 males. For every 100 females age 18 and over, there were 91.9 males.

The median income for a household in the city was $27,005, and the median income for a family was $33,391. Males had a median income of $26,724 versus $20,515 for females. The per capita income for the city was $15,894. About 14.6% of families and 19.2% of the population were below the poverty line, including 24.9% of those under age 18 and 17.3% of those age 65 or over.

Economy 
Being centrally located in the East Tennessee region, Morristown serves at the hub for a labor market area pulling most of its labor force from a surrounding seven-county area of 337,000 people.

Top employers
According to a March 2021 survey by the Morristown Area Chamber of Commerce, the top 15 employers in the city are:

Real estate
As of August 2020, Morristown has seen a high demand for both single-family and multi-family residential developments. Morristown reported a 110% increase in residential construction in the city's annual economic and community development report in 2020.

A study by Middle Tennessee State University found that the Morristown metropolitan area saw an 8.1% increase in housing prices in the third quarter of  2019 compared to the same period in 2018.

As of 2010, the median price for a home in the Morristown-Hamblen area was $125,600, compared with $142,000 in the Knoxville metropolitan area, and $177,900 nationally.

In 2010, the Morristown-Hamblen area was home to over 1,000 businesses, employing over 25,000 people. Total property tax revenue was almost equally divided amongst residential, commercial, and industrial properties, with residential property tax supplying 50.1%, commercial at 26.1%, and industrial at 20.1%.

Manufacturing
Morristown is considered to be one of the largest manufacturing and industrial hubs in the state of Tennessee. There are several industrial parks located in the eastern, western and southern parts of the city, and over 100 manufacturers have based their facilities in Morristown, ranging from food processing, aerospace technology, machine and parts production, plastics engineering, and many other industries.

In 2019, the Morristown area was reported to be home to 109 manufacturing companies, with projections showing Morristown could gain 3,000 jobs and over $600,000,000 dollars in investment in the manufacturing sector alone by the year 2024.

Morristown's manufacturing market employs nearly 10,000 or 24% of the workforce in Hamblen County, and an extra 11,000 commuting from surrounding counties such as Jefferson, Grainger, Cocke, and Hawkins for employment.

Retail
Morristown is considered a hub for retail, with the indoor regional College Square Mall serving an area of 300,000 people, and a diverse array of locally owned shops and franchised stores in retail developments dispersed around Morristown and in its downtown area. In 2016, the city saw nearly $1.4 billion in retail sales.

Arts and culture

Festivals
There are several annual festivals and events held in Morristown, some of the more notable events include:

Morristown Strawberry Festival - festival held every May celebrating strawberries harvested in Morristown.
Morristown Craft Beer Festival - Craft beer festival with live music held at the Morristown Farmers Market every September.
Mountain Makins Festival - Arts and crafts festival held at the Rose Center every October.

Historic sites
 Bethesda Presbyterian Church
 Crockett Tavern Museum
 General Longstreet's Headquarters Museum
 Morristown Main Street Historic District
 Morristown Cemetery
 The site of Morristown College, now Fulton-Hill Park
 Rose Center

Sports

Minor league baseball

Morristown hosted several Minor League Baseball teams from 1910 to 1961 at Sherwood Park. The Morristown Jobbers became charter members of the Southeastern League in 1910. The Jobbers continued in the Appalachian League in 1911 and played each season through 1914. From 1923 to 1925, the city's entry in the league was called the Morristown Roosters. In 1948, the Morristown Red Sox became charter members of the Mountain States League in which they played through 1954. The team won the league championship in their first season. The Red Sox folded early in the 1954 season and were replaced in the league by the Morristown Reds. The Morristown Cubs, the city's final professional baseball team played in the Appalachian League from 1959 to 1961 and won the 1959 pennant.

Little League
Little League softball in Morristown dates back to the late 20th century. In 1985 and 1987, Morristown had teams qualify for the Little League World Series; the 1985 team finished in third place. The Morristown teams were only two of eight Tennessee teams that have advanced to the series in Williamsport, Pennsylvania. Morristown would see podium placement by the 2000s, placing fourth in the 2006 Little League Softball World Series, and winning it the following year.

Parks and recreation
The Morristown-Hamblen area includes several parks and recreational sites, including Panther Creek State Park. Municipal and county recreation areas include Cherokee Park, Frank Lorino, Fred Miller, and Fulton-Hill. Public access for boating and swimming to Cherokee Reservoir is available in the northern area of the city and county. Morristown is also home to several golf and disc golf courses.

Government
Morristown uses the mayor-council government system, which was established in 1855 when the city was incorporated. Morristown is governed by a seven-member city council composed of the mayor and six council members, four members are elected from single-member districts and two members are elected at-large for the entire city. The citizens elect the mayor to a four-year term and the six council members to two-year terms.

The City Council meets every first and third Tuesday of each month at 5:00 p.m. in the Council Chambers at the City Center building.

Morristown is represented in the Tennessee House of Representatives in the 10th district by Representative Rick Eldridge, a Republican.

In the Tennessee State Senate, Morristown is represented by the 1st district by Senator Steve Southerland, also a Republican.

Morristown is represented in the United States House of Representatives by Republican Diana Harshbarger of the 1st congressional district.

Education

Public schools
Public schools in Morristown are operated by the Hamblen County Department of Education. There are four middle schools: East Ridge, Lincoln, Meadowview, and Westview. Morristown has two high schools: Morristown-Hamblen High School East and Morristown-Hamblen High School West.

Colleges
The main campus of Walters State Community College is located in Morristown.

The main campus and the aviation technology expansion campus of the Tennessee College of Applied Technology - Morristown, are located in Morristown.

Satellite campuses of King University and Tusculum College are located in Morristown.

Media

Radio
 104.7 WLNQ. The station airs country music, with local information and local air personalities. http://www.1047wlnq.com/. The tower is located in eastern Hamblen county, and the station broadcasts to the entire Lakeway area.

Newspaper
 Citizen Tribune, daily news publication for Morristown and its greater area in operation since 1966.

In film 
 The 1981 horror film The Evil Dead was filmed in neighboring Bean Station and in Morristown near Kidwell's Ridge Road. The cabin that featured significantly in the film has since burned down, with the only remains being bricks from the cabin's chimney.

Infrastructure

Healthcare
Morristown is home to the Morristown-Hamblen Hospital. The hospital has a 167-room capacity with 23 designated for emergency use. It is considered the main healthcare center in the Morristown metropolitan area.

Utilities
Morristown Utilities System (MUS) provides electricity, water, sewer, and fiber broadband internet to the City of Morristown and several eastern Hamblen County residents and businesses. It provides services to approximately 15,000 customers.

Appalachian Electric Cooperative (AEC), a utilities company based out of New Market in neighboring Jefferson County, provides electricity and fiber broadband internet for western and northern portions of Morristown, portions of Hamblen County, Jefferson County (including New Market, Baneberry, Jefferson City, Dandridge, and White Pine), and Grainger County (including Bean Station and Rutledge). AEC, as of June 2018, provides services to 46,000 customers.

Transportation

Morristown is an automobile-dependent city, almost entirely reliant on roadway infrastructure to support its large commuting-base residing inside the city and from surrounding counties.

All U.S. routes, state routes in Morristown, along with I-81, are maintained by the Tennessee Department of Transportation (TDOT) in TDOT Region 1, which consists of 24 counties in East Tennessee. Streets, sidewalks, and greenways in the Morristown-Hamblen area are maintained by either the Hamblen County Highway Department or the City of Morristown Public Works Department.

In 2002, the United States Census Bureau declared the municipalities of Morristown, Jefferson City, White Pine, and portions of unincorporated Hamblen and Jefferson counties as a part of an urbanized area. The Lakeway Area Metropolitan Transportation Planning Organization (LAMPTO) was created following the requirement of a designated MTPO for all urbanized areas in the United States. The LAMPTO plans and coordinates regional transportation projects in Morristown and its urbanized area.

Major highways
The sole interstate highway serving Morristown is Interstate 81, which connects the city to Interstate 40 in nearby Dandridge to the west, and the Tri-Cities region in northeasternmost Tennessee to the east.

U.S. Route 25E-Tennessee State Route 32 is the principal north–south route in Morristown, and connects the city from Interstate 81 at exit 8, to U.S. Route 11W in Bean Station. US 25E also extends to Interstate 75 in Corbin, Kentucky, serving as a popular alternate route of I-75 regarding construction and congestion in Knoxville. The route is given the designation Appalachian Development Highway System Corridor S from I-81 in Morristown to the Tennessee-Kentucky state line at the Cumberland Gap, and as High-Priority Corridor 12 of the National Highway System.

U.S. Route 11E-Tennessee State Route 34 is the principal east–west route in Morristown, paralleling the I-40-I-81 corridor, and connecting the city to Jefferson City to the west, and Greeneville to the east.

Tennessee State Route 160 is a bypass route of US 11E, and serves the city with access to I-81 at exit 12, US 25E, and US 11E.

Tennessee State Route 66 is a connector route to serving Morristown, connecting the city to I-81 exit 4 in White Pine, and to SR 160 and US 11E in west Morristown.

Principal highways
 
  (Morris Boulevard, West Andrew Johnson Highway)
  (Davy Crockett Parkway)
  (concurrent to US 25E)
  (concurrent to US 11E) 
  (Doctor Martin Luther King Jr. Parkway, East Andrew Johnson Highway, First North Street)
  (Governor Dewitt Clinton Senter Parkway, Air Park Boulevard, Enka Highway)

Major surface routes

 
  (Alpha Valley Home Road)
  (Panther Creek Road)
  (Cumberland Street, Buffalo Trail)
  (Old Russellville Pike)
  (Merchants Greene Boulevard)
 Brights Pike
 Cherokee Drive
 Commerce Boulevard
 Economy Road
 Kidwell Ridge Road
 Liberty Hill Road
 Lincoln Drive
 Main Street / Morningside Drive
 Sulpher Springs Road
 Veterans Parkway
 Walters Drive

Rail access
Norfolk Southern Railway operates freight transport throughout Morristown along several lines, including the Crescent Corridor. The Southern Railway used to serve Johnson City with several trains: the Birmingham Special (ended, 1970), the Pelican (ended, 1970) and the Tennessean (ended, 1968).

Mass transit
Public transportation is provided by Lakeway Transit. Three fixed bus routes connect to the downtown area, most residential areas, and major shopping centers throughout the city. Lakeway Transit operates using passenger fares, and city, state, federal funding.

Airport

Morristown and the surrounding area is served by Morristown Regional Airport (IATA:MOR), a  airport equipped with one  runway.  The airport is located southwest of Morristown's central business district near the neighborhood of Alpha, and is operated by the municipal government.

Notable people 

 Ermal Allen, professional football player and coach
 Darrius Blevins, professional football player
 James E. Bruce, Kentucky state representative
 Arnold W. Bunch Jr., U.S. Air Force four-star general and current commander of Air Force Materiel Command 
 Davy Crockett, pioneer; grew up in Morristown, born in nearby Greene County
 Mike Ford, former NASCAR crew chief for Denny Hamlin
 Elaine Hendrix, animal rights activist and actress
 Tim Horner, professional wrestler, politician
 Evelyn Bryan Johnson, aviator, Morristown Regional Airport manager
 Josiah Leming, American Idol contestant, alternative rock artist
 Brett Martin, professional baseball player
 William McFarland, U.S. congressman, mayor of Morristown
 Rickey Parkey, champion boxer
 Gideon Morris, trans-Appalachian pioneer and founder of Morristown
 Frankie Randall, world champion boxer
 Randy Sanders, former quarterback for Morristown East High School and the Tennessee Volunteers; former head football coach of East Tennessee State University
 Dewitt Clinton Senter, Governor of Tennessee, legislator
 Joe Shipley, former professional baseball player and head coach of the East Tennessee State University baseball team
 James Stewart, professional football player
 Uncle Am Stuart, early country and folk music fiddle player
 Jane Wagner, playwright and actress
 Herbert S. Walters, Democratic United States Senator, namesake of Walters State Community College 
 Calvin Ward, soldier, Medal of Honor recipient
 John A. Willis, Theatre World and film book editor, theatre awards producer, actor, and educator

References

Further reading
 Baker, Christopher Warren. “The Small Town in the Global Economy: A Case Study of Development and Resistance in a Southern Appalachian Industrial Center” University of Tennessee. 1995
 Brooks, Cora Davis. "History of Morristown 1787 - 1936" 1936.
 Hill, Howard. "The Morristown-Hamblen Library"
 Hobby, Larry. "Morristown" Arcadia Publishing 2013

External links

 
Convention and Visitors Bureau

 
Populated places established in 1787
Cities in Tennessee
Cities in Hamblen County, Tennessee
Cities in Jefferson County, Tennessee
County seats in Tennessee
Cities in Morristown metropolitan area, Tennessee
1787 establishments in North Carolina